Vikedal or Vikadal is a village in Vindafjord municipality in Rogaland county, Norway. Vikedal Church is located in this village.

The village has a long history of boat-building.  The village was the administrative center of the old municipality of Vikedal which existed from 1838 until 1965.

References

Villages in Rogaland
Vindafjord